Chile Tennis Federation is the national governing body of a tennis in Chile. The federation was formed on April 3, 1920 in Santiago, under the name of the Lawn Tennis Association of Chile (LTAC). In 1948 LTAC joined the International Tennis Federation. At the national level it is affiliated to the Chilean Olympic Committee and on region basis it is the member of South America Tennis Confederation.

Chile Tennis Federation operates all of the Chilean national representative tennis sides, including the Chile Davis Cup team, the Chile Fed Cup team and youth sides as well. CTF is also responsible for organizing and hosting tennis tournaments within Chile and scheduling the home international fixtures.

References

National members of the South America Tennis Confederation
Tennis
Tennis in Chile
1920 establishments in Chile
Sports organizations established in 1920